The St Augustine Town Plan Historic District is a U.S. National Historic Landmark District encompassing the colonial heart of the city.  It substantially encompasses the street plan of the city as contained within the bounds of walls (no longer standing) built between the 16th and early 19th centuries.  The district is bounded by Cordova, Orange, and St. Francis Streets, and Matanzas Bay.  It was designated a National Historic Landmark in 1970, although its boundaries were not formally defined until 1986.

Description and history
St. Augustine, founded by Spain in 1565, is the oldest permanent European settlement on the mainland of North America, north of Mexico.  Its long colonial history extends to 1822, when Spanish East Florida was annexed to the United States as part of the Florida Territory.  The city core's street plan, with narrow streets, dates to the first period of Spanish control, which ended in 1763 with the cession of Florida to Great Britain.  Britain returned Florida to Spain in 1784.  Roughly half of the area's buildings were built before 1925, with a substantially large number in either Spanish Colonial or Moorish Revival styles.

Landmarks
Some of the most distinctive of the city's landmarks are located in the district, and have their origins in the Spanish settlement.  Construction of the Castillo de San Marcos, located at the northeastern end of the district, began with the community's founding, and the central plaza was also an early defining feature.  The plaza is now faced by the Cathedral Basilica of St. Augustine, built during the second Spanish period in 1793–94, and by a 1930s post office that was designed to strongly resemble the original Spanish governor's palace, which it replaced.  Further south in the district stand a cluster of some of the city's oldest surviving residences, including the  González–Alvarez House ( the Oldest House, the oldest surviving house in the city) and the Llambias House.

Other contributing properties
Blacksmith Shop
Florida Heritage House (Wakeman House)
Gallegos House
Gómez House
Gonzáles and De Hita Houses
Luciano de Herrera House
Oliveros House
Pellicer-De Burgo House
Ponce de Leon Hotel
Ribera House
Rodríguez House
Salcedo House & Kitchen
Santoyo House
Sims Silversmith Shop
Spanish Military Hospital Museum
Triay House
Wells Print Shop
William Watson House

Gallery

See also
List of National Historic Landmarks in Florida
National Register of Historic Places listings in St. Johns County, Florida

References

External links
 
 

National Historic Landmarks in Florida
National Register of Historic Places in St. Johns County, Florida
St. Augustine, Florida
Historic districts on the National Register of Historic Places in Florida
1970 establishments in Florida